The 2019 Siberian wildfires began in July 2019 in poorly accessible areas of northern Krasnoyarsk Krai, Sakha Republic and Zabaykalsky Krai, all in Siberia, Russia. By the end of the month the size of the fires reached . As of 30 July, there had been no reported deaths or injuries due to the fires.

The 2019 Siberia wildfires generated significant publicity, especially among social media users. As a result, a process of reviewing legal regulations regarding forest protection and forest fire extinguishing activities was started at the state level.

Extent 
On 31 July 2019, Russian authorities reported that 3 million hectares were on fire, an area roughly the size of Belgium.

The smoke from the fires affected air quality in much of Siberia, including cities Novosibirsk, Krasnoyarsk, Omsk and other. Air travel was also disrupted. According to NASA data, on 31 July the smoke from burning Siberian forests reached the territory of Alaska and, possibly mixed with smoke from local fires, reached the western coast of Canada.

As most of the area affected was in uninhabited and/or poorly accessible areas, most of the fires are not being attended by firefighters. The smoke from the fires made aerial firefighting unsafe. In 2020, extreme heat fueled enormous outbreaks of wildfires in the Arctic Circle exceeding the 2019 record for CO2 emissions. In 2021, Siberia was hit again by extraordinary dry weather, record forest fires and smog.

Reactions 
On 1 August, Prime Minister Dmitry Medvedev ordered an investigation into the accusation that fires were started intentionally to conceal illegal logging. Officials in Krasnoyarsk were under investigation for neglecting to fight the fires. Medvedev also proposed revising regulatory acts in the field of extinguishing fires in regions including control zones, and instructed to consult with foreign experts in developing proposals to fight with wildfires, while US president Donald Trump offered Russia help in extinguishing the wildfires.

See also

 2021 Russian wildfires
 2018 Russian wildfires
 2015 Russian wildfires
 2010 Russian wildfires
 August curse
 Climate change in Russia
 List of wildfires

References

Siberia
wildfires
Wildfires in Russia
Krasnoyarsk Krai
Sakha Republic
Zabaykalsky Krai
2019 disasters in Russia